James C. Metzger (born February 18, 1959) is an American businessman and philanthropist.  He is the founder, chairman and CEO of The Whitmore Group, Ltd., a Long Island insurance brokerage and financial services firm that opened during 1989. Metzger is a former All-American lacrosse player at Hofstra University and an multi-sport athlete at Half Hollow Hills High School East (Half Hollow Hills Central School District) in Dix Hills. His high school lacrosse jersey (#21) and university lacrosse jersey (#56) have been retired at both schools. His football jersey (#21) also has been retired by his high school.

Athletic career

Half Hollow Hills High School
Metzger is a 1977 graduate of Half Hollow Hills High School East, where he was successful in lacrosse, football and basketball.

As an All-American lacrosse player, Metzger won the Lt. Ray Enners Award as Outstanding Lacrosse Player in Suffolk County for the 1977 season. His scoring average of 6.0 points per game was a school record and led Suffolk County (Public Schools). During that same year, Metzger set school records for points in a season, and assists in a game, season and career. Lt. Raymond Enners, a military hero, also played lacrosse for Hills East and later for the U.S. Military Academy at West Point. During 2019, the school officially retired the jerseys worn by Lt. Enners (#26) and Metzger (#21).

Metzger also excelled in football, graduating as the school's all-time leading scorer and rusher. He was a Suffolk County All-Star Running Back, known for starting 25 consecutive games and rushing for 2,155 yards, scoring 27 touchdowns and totaling 170 points. Metzger's career total offense, including receptions and returns, was 2,777 yards. He led the team in scoring in 1974, 1975 and 1976, and rushing in 1975 and 1976.

For 1977, Metzger was the only high school athlete to be selected and participate in both the Suffolk County North – South All-Star Football Game and the North – South All-Star Lacrosse Game. He started at running back on the North Football Team and started at attack for the North Lacrosse Team. Metzger also played basketball for the 1974-1975 school varsity basketball team in the Suffolk County Playoffs. 

During the 2021 season, Metzger's football jersey (#21) was retired by the school. His touchdown record was broken during the same season by senior Dakim Griffin. For the season and playoffs, Griffin scored 35 touchdowns and helped lead the team to the Division II Championship game.

Metzger was recruited to play football by Syracuse, Cornell and Colgate. He was recruited to play lacrosse by Virginia, Army, Navy, Cornell, Penn State, Towson, North Carolina State and Hofstra University.

Naval Academy Preparatory School

Following high school, Metzger attended the Naval Academy Preparatory School. A starter at running back on the football team, He sustained a severe shoulder injury that ended his football career. However, he led the lacrosse team in goals, assists and points, and he received the team's Most Valuable Player Award.

Hofstra University
Metzger was a Division 1 All-American lacrosse player at Hofstra University. His sophomore record-setting scoring average of 4.9 points per game still stands. Metzger's single season average ranks fifth in the history of the  program and his single season assist average ranks eighth all time. Metzger is one of only three players in the history of Hofstra's Men's Lacrosse to score eight or more points three times in one season. During the 1980 season, he recorded eight points in games against Penn State, Towson and North Carolina State.

Whitmore Agency
 Metzger entered the insurance brokerage business during 1983 and he founded The Whitmore Group, Ltd. during 1989. Various media, including Long Island Business News, reported during 2011 that The Whitmore Group, now known as Whitmore Agency, was the seventh largest insurance brokerage business on Long Island.

On March 1, 2019, Whitmore was acquired by Acrisure. 
Located in Garden City, New York, the company has more than 70 employees.

Hofstra University

Metzger is a frequent contributor to the educational and athletic programs at Hofstra University in Hempstead, New York.

During 2012 Metzger donated $1.5 million, the largest gift ever received by Hofstra Athletics. Hofstra named The James C. Metzger Fund for Capital Improvements and The James C. Metzger Hofstra Lacrosse Endowment in his honor in appreciation of the gift.

Hofstra dedicated James C. Metzger Hall on April 7, 2015. Located on the west side of Shuart Stadium on the Hofstra campus, Metzger Hall includes The Fried Center (second floor), stadium suites (third floor) and the stadium press box (fourth floor). The Fried Center is the home for academic and career development pursuits and it also houses the Student-Athlete Advisory Committee (SAAC) and the Athletic Department's community service program.

Metzger received the Hofstra Alumnus of the Year Award during 2016. The previous year, he was inducted into the Hofstra Athletics Hall of Fame. During 2012, Metzger received Hofstra University's Alumni Achievement Award, a recognition presented to alumni who have distinguished themselves in their chosen fields of endeavor and/or demonstrated outstanding service to the university. A year earlier, he received Hofstra's Joseph M. Margiotta Distinguished Service Award. Named for a Hofstra student-athlete and supporter of the university, the award is presented in recognition of extraordinary dedication, generosity and service to the Hofstra Pride Club and Hofstra athletics.

Hofstra University Athletics Projects At Margiotta Hall

Metzger's philanthropic involvement with Hofstra University began during 2007 with several special projects that addressed improvements for Margiotta Hall, the three-story, 22,500 square-foot building that is the main field house for Hofstra athletics.

The Royle - Sombrotto Men's Lacrosse Locker Rooms at Hofstra were built that same year with funds donated by Metzger. According to Metzger, he wanted to memorialize the contributions to Hofstra lacrosse by two people who also had impacted his own life and career. One person is his coach, Harry Royle, who was Hofstra's Head Men's Lacrosse Coach from 1976 through 1985. The other person is Vincent Sombrotto, a former teammate and professional lacrosse player who, according to Metzger, had a will to win and a level of intensity that made him "the closest thing to a perfect lacrosse player that I have ever seen." During 2019, Hofstra Athletics announced that Metzger provided an additional leadership gift to the university to support the renovation of the locker facilities. The project, completed and unveiled on January 13, 2020, features 48 new lockers and a complete remodel of the locker rooms. Metzger also established a matching gift campaign for alumni of the lacrosse program, with lockers named to honor former players.

The Hallway Traditions Project at Margiotta Hall was created to showcase the history of the men's and women's lacrosse programs and the football program. The project, funded by Metzger during 2009, was named for Hofstra standout athletes Mike D’Amato ‘68 and Lou DiBlasi ‘61. DiBlasi also was Metzger's coach at Half Hollow Hills High School.

The Lacrosse Reception Room was named after Gary Arnold '83 and the Unterstein family. Arnold was Metzger's teammate at Hofstra. He was a four-year letterman in lacrosse and team leader in goals for 1981 and 1982. Following graduation, he served as an assistant coach under Harry Royle. The Unterstein family is the only family in Hofstra lacrosse history collectively to earn conference player of the year (Chris, 2006), defensive player of the year (Kevin, 2008) and rookie of the year (Mike, 2005). Chris Unterstein earned 2005 first-team All-America honors while Kevin was an honorable mention All-American for 2007. The three brothers also participated in the North-South Senior All-star game (Chris, 2006; Kevin and Mike; 2008). Funding for renovations of the reception room was provided by Metzger during 2009.

The Metzger-Huff Lacrosse Offices at Hofstra University were dedicated during 2010 and named for Metzger and Kevin Huff (Hofstra '78). When Metzger learned that Hofstra planned to name the lacrosse offices for him, he insisted that the facility also honor Huff, who was an assistant coach when Metzger attended the university. A football and men's lacrosse standout, Huff was a two-time All-American in lacrosse, an All-American in football and he still holds the Hofstra record for rushing yards per game. Funding for the construction was provided by Metzger.

The women's lacrosse locker room was named to honor of James C. Metzger during 2010 in recognition of his support to the university's women's lacrosse program.

Other notable charities and recognition

Athletic Awards For Boys Lacrosse And Football

Half Hollow Hills High School East and West established the James C. Metzger Outstanding Player Award during 2011 as an annual recognition presented to the school's best player. During 2021, Half Hollow Hills High School East renamed its football offensive player award to honor Metzger.

The annual James C. Metzger Leadership Awards for Nassau County high school players are presented to one player on each of the eight teams that compete in the boys lacrosse championship finals.

The annual James C. Metzger MVP Awards are presented to high school  players from Nassau County and Suffolk County who participate in the Long Island Lacrosse Championship games.

The James C. Metzger Cup, as part of The Long Island Lacrosse Showcase, is presented to each winning team among the rising freshmen, sophomores, juniors and seniors of Nassau County and Suffolk County. The James C. Metzger Most Valuable Player Award is presented to a player at each game. 

The James C. Metzger Award is presented to a player for the Hempstead, New York, Police Athletic League lacrosse team for fifth and sixth graders for “strong work ethic and improvement made throughout the lacrosse season."

Athletic Recognition

The National Jewish Sports Hall of Fame and Museum selected Metzger to receive its 2013 George Young Award. The recognition is presented to an individual, Jewish or non-Jewish, who has best exemplified the high ideals displayed by the late National Football League executive. 

The Suffolk Sports Hall of Fame, in recognition of his high school athletic achievements, continued success in athletics at Hofstra University, and for his business and philanthropic contributions on Long Island, inducted Metzger as part of its class of 2014.

The Adelphi University Athletic Hall of Fame recognized Metzger as the 25th recipient of the Woodruff Lifetime Achievement Award during 2016. The honor recognizes “excellence in coaching, teaching and educating young adults while saluting an ambassador of sportsmanship and goodwill and stressing that the athletic experience enhances the educational experience and quality of life.”

James C. Metzger Stadium, the new 1,000-capacity stadium at St. Anthony's High School, in South Huntington, New York, was completed during 2016. Metzger is not a St. Anthony's  alum, but he has become a benefactor to that school. Raised in the area, Metzger said the school was the epicenter of his world, calling it “a great environment, great history, great legacy both academically and, of course, athletically...”

At about this same time, Metzger and his company initiated support for the New York City Chapter of the National Football Foundation (NFF), sponsoring the Mr. Football New York City Player of the Year Award for the city's outstanding high school player. During 2019, in support of the NFF, Whitmore served as the presenting sponsor at the beginning of the 2019 Cortaca Jug, “the biggest little game in the nation” between the SUNY Cortland Red Dragons and Ithaca College Bombers. The November 16 game, the 61st edition of the contest, was relocated to MetLife Stadium in East Rutherford, New Jersey, to celebrate the 150th anniversary of college football and shatter the attendance record for a Division III football game. As of January 2020, NFF’s Suffolk County Chapter on Long Island was renamed the NFF James C. Metzger/Suffolk County Chapter. The chapter’s prestigious Top Scholar Athlete Award presented to the annual outstanding high school football player also was named to honor Metzger.

Other Charities

Big Brothers Big Sisters of America Long Island Chapter (BBBSLI) named the James C. Metzger and E. David Woycik Endowment Fund during 2010 after both gentlemen presented the single largest contribution in the organization's history.  That same year, Metzger was  honored as the Big Brothers Big Sisters Man of the Year and its Presidential Honoree. His philanthropic spirit helped the organization raise $300,000 at its annual Presidential Gala.

The Boys & Girls Clubs of America Newark Chapter (BGCN) presented Metzger with its 2020 Cynthia M. Banks Award for Caring. Named for a long-time employee, the award recognizes people who support programs that improve the lives of children at the chapter.

References

1959 births
Living people
American chief executives of financial services companies
Hofstra Pride men's lacrosse players
People from Dix Hills, New York
Sportspeople from Suffolk County, New York
Lacrosse players from New York (state)